Frain may refer to:

Frain (name), a surname
Frain, Vosges, a commune in France
Vranov nad Dyjí, a market town in the Czech Republic, also known by its German name, Frain

See also
Frane